Arthur Frederic Clarke  (22 December  1848 – 4 January 1932) was an eminent Anglican priest in the late nineteenth and early twentieth centuries.
He was educated at Charterhouse and Trinity College, Oxford.  He was ordained in 1874. After curacies at  Beverley, Linthorpe, Alvechurch   and   Leek Wootton he was Vicar of Cockerham from 1881 until 1905; and Archdeacon of Lancaster from 1896 to 1905. He was then Vicar of Rochdale from 1905 to 1910; its Rural Dean from 1905 to 1910; and its Archdeacon from 1910 to 1919. During this period he was also an honorary chaplain to the forces.
A bell at St Andrew, Singapore is dedicated to him.

References

People educated at Charterhouse School
Alumni of Trinity College, Oxford
Archdeacons of Rochdale
1848 births
1932 deaths